Kevin S. Bright (born November 15, 1954) is an American television executive producer and director whose credits include Dream On and Friends.

Early life
Born to a Jewish-American family in New York City, Bright attended the East Side Hebrew Institute on the Lower East Side of Manhattan and graduated magna cum laude from Emerson College.

Career

Bright started his professional career under the tutelage of his father, Jackie Bright. After graduation, he worked in New York with Joseph Cates, where he produced specials for George Burns, Johnny Cash, David Copperfield, and Dolly Parton. After moving to Los Angeles in 1982, he started work in comedy programming such as The History of White People in America and comedy specials starring Robin Williams, Martin Mull, Harry Shearer, Paul Shaffer, and Merrill Markoe.

In 1993, Bright entered a partnership with Marta Kauffman and David Crane to form Bright/Kauffman/Crane Productions and began a development deal with Warner Bros. Television to produce the comedy series Friends. He also directed 60 episodes of the series, including the series finale.

After Friends, he went on to executive-produce the spin-off series Joey with Friends producers Shana Goldberg-Meehan and Scott Silveri. Joey starred Friends actor Matt LeBlanc as the title character and featured Jennifer Coolidge, also an Emerson College attendee. Joey was cancelled on May 15, 2006, during its second season after a major ratings slump.

After Joey, Bright moved back to Boston where he began working at his alma mater, Emerson College. Over the last four years at Emerson, he executive produced three-sketch comedy shows, Zebro: A Laugh Show and Chocolate Cake City, four original half-hour situation comedies, Browne At Midnight, Saturdays, Ground Floor, and Record Cellar, and a live multi-cam stand-up comedy special, Die Laughing.  He also serves as an advisor to The EVVY Awards.

Bright then went on to teach a series of television production classes in the Visual Media Arts department, and helped develop the program for Emerson's new LA Center, which opened in 2013.  Kevin ran a diversity workshop for high school students through Emerson College, and worked with Perkins School for the Blind in Watertown, MA, to develop a method of teaching television production to the blind.

Bright moved back to Los Angeles in 2013, when he was appointed as Founding Director of the Emerson Los Angeles program. There, he has focused on building new programs that take full advantage of the opportunities Emerson's expanded presence in Los Angeles provides.

Bright also directed a documentary in 2007 with Linda Feferman called Who Ordered Tax? about his father, Jackie, who was an actor and vaudevillian performer.

In 2016 Bright served as the executive producer of the documentary Best and Most Beautiful Things about Michelle Smith, a woman from Bangor, Maine who is both legally blind and autistic.

Bright also directed on CBS comedy Man with a Plan in 2019 for one episode, reuniting with Friends alum Matt LeBlanc.

Personal life
Bright lives with his wife, Claudia Wilsey Bright in Saratoga Springs, New York.

Filmography

Film

Television

References

External links
 
 

1954 births
American television directors
Television producers from New York City
Emerson College alumni
Emerson College faculty
Living people
Jewish American writers
East Side Hebrew Institute alumni
Businesspeople from New York City
American television writers
Screenwriters from New York (state)
Screenwriters from Massachusetts
People from the Lower East Side
21st-century American Jews